Act of Settlement most commonly refers to the Act of Settlement 1701, an Act of the Parliament of England.

Act of Settlement or Settlement Act may also refer to:
Act for the Settlement of Ireland 1652, in response to the Irish Rebellion of 1641
Act of Settlement 1657,  ratifying previous decrees from  the Act for the Settlement of Ireland 1652
Act of Settlement 1662, a partial reversal of the Act of Settlement of 1652
Poor Relief Act 1662 ("the Settlement Act"), clarifying which parishes were responsible for Poor Relief
Act of Settlement 1704, clarifying the status of the population of the Isle of Man

See also

Closer Settlement Acts, New Zealand
Settlement (disambiguation)